Acetyl fluoride is an acyl halide with the chemical formula CH3COF. The formula is commonly abbreviated AcF.

Synthesis
Acetyl fluoride is synthesized using hydrogen fluoride and acetic anhydride. Acetic acid is produced as a byproduct. 

 +  →  +

See also
Acetyl chloride
Acylation

References

Acyl fluorides